Clásica de Sabiñánigo was a road bicycle race held annually in Aragon, Spain from 1969 until 2001. The race was known as the Clásica Zaragoza-Sabiñanigo until 1992.

Winners

References

Notes

Cycle races in Spain
Recurring sporting events established in 1969
1969 establishments in Spain
Sport in Aragon
2001 disestablishments in Spain
Defunct cycling races in Spain
Recurring sporting events disestablished in 2001